Privolzhsky Research Medical University (Research Medical University of Volga region, old-name: Nizhny Novgorod State Medical Academy, NNSMA) is one of the medical schools in the Russian Federation which is located in the city of Nizhny Novgorod.

Organisation 

 the rector was  Shakhov Boris Yevgenevich (Russian Шахов Борис Евгеньевич), D.Sc., Honored Worker of Science RF.

This medical school is currently ranked number 7 out of 46 higher medical institutions in Russia, acknowledged by World Health Organization.

This academy also is associated with many teaching hospitals distributed throughout the city, where the students learn many basic clinical skills. There are 70 specialised departments with over 600 teaching staff. It has approximately 3000 students in 7 faculties which include:

 Faculty of Medicine
 Faculty of Pediatrics
 Faculty of Pharmacy
 Faculty of Medico-prophylaxis (Preventive medicine)
 Faculty of Stomatology (Dentistry)
 Faculty of Higher Nursing Education
 Faculty of Preparatory courses (Pre-medical courses)

The administrative office of the academy is situated in the Minin and Pozharsky Square (located alongside the Volga River and the medical students live in dormitories on Meditsinskaya Street in Prioksky City District.

Faculty of Foreign Admissions 

Some of the foreign students study medicine completely in English medium, and some others study in Russian language. The current Dean of the Foreign Students Department is Professor Stelnikova D.Sc., who is also the Head of the department for anatomy.

However, students who study in English medium also have to study Russian language to be able to communicate with local Russian people who have very little knowledge of English, and thus being able to communicate with patients for basic clinical training.

Faculty of Medicine 

Most students have to undergo one year of preliminary course for one year, before continuing their undergraduate studies. General Medicine program lasts after 6 years.

The first academic year of the General Medicine course begins with the teaching of fundamental medical sciences such as medical biology, Biophysics, general chemistry and Organic Chemistry, History of Medicine, Human Anatomy, and so on. Because of the aforementioned, the course runs in a longer duration (a 6-year programme) as compared to General Medicine courses (5-year programmes) offered by other universities in other countries.

Clinical education starts officially on the third academic year with the so-called "cycles". Every few weeks, students are rotated and exposed to different parts of clinical medicine such as Internal Medicine, General Surgery, Infectious Diseases, Pediatrics, Obstetrics, Gynecology, Neurology, Orthopedics, Radiology, Public Health and so on. Classes are then conducted in different specialised hospitals within the Nizhny Novgorod region.

Upon graduation, the graduates are awarded a first professional degree which is the doctor of medicine or M.D. which is an M.B.B.S. equivalent because the graduates have been trained in the field of general surgery.

Accommodation and Cultural Life 
Each hostel is equipped with a canteen and cafe with provisions of kitchen and dining hall on each floor.

Postgraduate Programmes 

Postgraduate courses are also provided for both Russian and international students. Among the courses are Internal Medicine, Pediatrics, Radiology, General Surgery, Traumatology and Orthopedics, Cardiovascular Surgery, Infectious Diseases, Neurology, Pediatric Surgery, Obstetric and Gynaecology, Epidemiology, Hygiene, Microbiology, Orthodontics etc.

See also
Education in Russia

References

Universities in Volga Region
Educational institutions established in 1920
Medical schools in Russia
Tourist attractions in Nizhny Novgorod
Military medicine in Russia
1920 establishments in Russia